The Nall Baronetcy, of Hoveringham Hall in the County of Nottingham, is a title in the Baronetage of the United Kingdom. It was created on 25 January 1954 for Joseph Nall, who had earlier represented Hulme in the House of Commons as a Conservative. The title is held by his grandson (the third Baronet) Edward William Joseph, who succeeded his father in 2001. He married (2004) Helen Fiona; they have one daughter (b 2005) Georgina Philippa Louise.

Nall baronets, of Hoveringham Hall (1954)
Sir Joseph Nall, 1st Baronet (1887–1958)
Sir Michael Joseph Nall, 2nd Baronet (1921–2001)
Sir Edward William Joseph Nall, 3rd Baronet (born 1952)

Notes

References
Kidd, Charles, Williamson, David (editors). Debrett's Peerage and Baronetage (1990 edition). New York: St Martin's Press, 1990, 

Nall